Gangal is a village situated in the administrative sub-division Rawalpindi tehsil of district Rawalpindi, Punjab,  Pakistan.
|

Villages in Rawalpindi Tehsil